Corentin Chaminade (born 3 July 1999) is a French professional footballer who plays as a defender for Entente Boé Bon-Encontre.

Career
Raised in Lot-et-Garonne, Chaminade is one of three central defenders from the department to play professionally. He made his professional debut with Pau in a 3–0 Ligue 2 win over LB Châteauroux on 7 November 2020.

References

External links
 

1999 births
Sportspeople from Agen
Footballers from Nouvelle-Aquitaine
Living people
Association football defenders
French footballers
Pau FC players
AS Muret players
FC Bastia-Borgo players
Ligue 2 players
Championnat National players
Championnat National 3 players